Tolgahan Sahin (born 10 October 2004) is an Austrian professional footballer who plays as a midfielder for 2. Liga club Liefering.

Career statistics

Club

Notes

References

2004 births
Living people
Austrian footballers
Austria youth international footballers
Association football midfielders
2. Liga (Austria) players
LASK players
FC Red Bull Salzburg players
FC Liefering players